The Cambridge Museum of Technology is an industrial heritage museum situated in Cambridge, England. The original building, a Scheduled Ancient Monument,
housed a combined sewage pumping and waste destructor station built in 1894.  The Museum helps people to explore, enjoy, and learn about their industrial heritage by celebrating the achievements of local industries and the people who worked in them. The large site on the River Cam has green spaces for picnics and a fun, relaxed atmosphere for families. There are audio-visual displays, hands-on exhibits, and children’s activities, as well as traditional museum displays and historic buildings. The Victorian Pumping Station with its original machinery showcases 19th-century engineering and technology. Displays on the forgotten industries of Cambridge reveal an alternative side of the city’s history to the famous colleges. And the story is brought into the 20th Century with exhibitions on innovative local companies in our new Pye building. Featuring Pye (Electronics company) and Cambridge Scientific Instrument Company.

History of the pumping station
The Cheddars Lane Pumping Station was originally opened in 1894 in a scheme which also saw the creation of a sewage farm at Milton, two and a quarter miles away. Household rubbish was burnt to raise steam, to power the engines which pumped sewage to the Milton sewage farm. At the farm it was used as a fertiliser to grow the crops which fed the horses that pulled the carts which collected the rubbish and brought it to the pumping station. Even the ash from the burnt rubbish could be used in road making.

1894, original equipment
Originally, the boilers used to provide steam to the sewage pumping engines were heated by the burning of waste collected around the city in destructor furnaces, these are the only near complete examples surviving. It represents a typical early design and layout of a good medium-sized municipal destructor, buildings, and its equipment and chimney.

The museum's main attraction are two Hathorn Davey steam engines, one of which is fully operational and often runs on steam weekends. The purpose of these engines were to lift foul water (sewage and rain water) from the sump immediately below it to the sewage farm at Milton, the total lift being about 43 ft. These engines were designed to pump 250,000 gallons of sewage per hour, a job which they undertook until 1968, when a new electric engine house was built adjacent to the station, although this site shut down in 1994.

The chimney shaft is 175 ft. in height, octagonal with square base, lined with; fire-bricks for a height of 50 ft., and is 6 ft. 6 in. internal diameter at the top. 
In 1992 the chimney was laddered by Fred Dibnah, who undertook painting and pointing repairs and was featured in a BBC programme.

The building now used as the print shop was built as a public health disinfector in about 1900. Waste steam was used for sterilising bed linen and clothing from municipal hospitals and old people's homes and latterly a workshop for the pumping station.

1909, gas engines
To cope with pumping demand after heavy rainfall, caused by the expansion of Cambridge, in 1909 two 94 hp National gas engines were added to the pumping station. These engines drove, by a flat belt, two 15inch Rees Returbo centrifugal pumps, but these were replaced in 1935 by Gwynnes Limited pumps. They could pump to Milton or to temporary storage in storm water tanks, but the prime movers of the sewage remained the steam engines.  The storm water tanks had a capacity of 1,085,275 gallons. Of these gas engines, currently one is in working order.

1923, new boiler
By the 1920s, a combination of the reducing calorific value of the waste and an end to Sunday collection of waste, led to an additional Babcock & Wilcox boiler being installed and used when there was insufficient waste for the destructor furnaces. This boiler was fuelled by coke, a by-product of the Coal gas production process, often being sourced from the Cambridge gas works next to the pumping station.
By 1942 this boiler provided the main steam supply, the destructor cells being used only for trade refuse and standby duty.

1937, electric pump
An electric pump was the last to be installed on the site, in 1937. A Crompton Parkinson electric pump motor drove the 18inch (0.45m) diameter Gwynnes centrifugal pump 114 hp electric motor that can be seen at the river end of its dedicated room. Its purpose was to cope with the ever increasing storm surges from the new housing estates.

Collections
Other exhibits include a working steam winch, hauling a narrow gauge incline railway using side tipping skip wagons to assist with the ash removal; various other engines (steam and otherwise); a print room with a large collection of old printing technology including a Linotype machine; a large collection of electrical apparatuses and more.

See also
 Prickwillow Museum
 Stretham Old Engine
 Anson Engine Museum

References

External links 

 Museum website

Museums in Cambridge
Local museums in Cambridgeshire
Steam museums in England
Technology museums in the United Kingdom
Tourist attractions in Cambridge
Scheduled monuments in Cambridgeshire
Industrial archaeological sites in the United Kingdom